Yellayapalem is located in the Kodavalur sub-district in the Nellore district in the state of Andhra Pradesh. The Indian census reports a population of 8215, with 2060 households.

A river, the Maldevi, runs through the village.

References

Villages in Nellore district